Stefan Johannesson (born 22 November 1971) is a Swedish football referee. Johannesson currently resides in Täby.  He was a full international referee for FIFA between 2003 and 2017. He became a professional referee in 1994 and has been an Allsvenskan referee since 2001. Johannesson has refereed 235 matches in Allsvenskan, 32 matches in Superettan and 79 international matches as of 2014.

See also 

 List of football referees

References

External links 
FIFA
SvFF

1971 births
Living people
Swedish football referees